Narvalo was one of four s built for the  (Royal Italian Navy) during the late 1920s. The boat served in World War II and was sunk in 1943 by British destroyers and aircraft.

Design and description
The Squalo-class submarines were essentially repeats of the preceding . They displaced  surfaced and  submerged. Their crew numbered 53 officers and enlisted men.

For surface running, the boats were powered by two  diesel engines, each driving one propeller shaft. When submerged each propeller was driven by a  electric motor. They could reach  on the surface and  underwater.

The boats were armed with eight internal  torpedo tubes, four each in the bow and stern. They carried a total of a dozen torpedoes. They were also armed with one  deck gun for combat on the surface. Their anti-aircraft armament consisted of two  machine guns.

Construction and career
Narvalo, named for the narwhal, was laid down on 17 October 1928 at the Cantieri Riuniti dell'Adriatico (CRDA) shipyard at Monfalcone. She was launched on 15 March 1930 and completed on 6 December.

See also
Italian submarines of World War II

References

Bibliography

External links
 Narvalo (1930)  Marina Militare website

1930 ships
Squalo-class submarines
World War II submarines of Italy
Lost submarines of Italy
World War II shipwrecks in the Mediterranean Sea
Maritime incidents in January 1943
Ships built by Cantieri Riuniti dell'Adriatico